The 2004 Rugby Canada Super League season was the seventh season for the RCSL.

Standings
Western Division
{| class="wikitable" style="text-align: center;"
|-
! width="250"|Team
! width="20"|Pld
! width="20"|W
! width="20"|D
! width="20"|L
! width="20"|F
! width="20"|A
! width="25"|+/-
! width="20"|BP
! width="20"|Pts
|-
|align=left| Vancouver Island Crimson Tide
|6||6||0||0||249||70||+179||5||29
|-
|align=left| Vancouver Wave
|6||4||0||2||164||101||+63||6||22
|-
|align=left| Calgary Mavericks
|6||4||0||2||182||115||+67||3||19
|-
|align=left| Fraser Valley Venom
|6||3||1||2||152||134||+18||3||17
|-
|align=left| Edmonton Gold
|6||2||1||3||119||161||-42||3||13
|-
|align=left| Saskatchewan Prairie Fire
|6||1||0||5||63||218||-155||0||4
|-
|align=left| Manitoba Buffalo
|6||0||0||6||76||206||-130||2||2
|}

Eastern Division
{| class="wikitable" style="text-align: center;"
|-
! width="250"|Team
! width="20"|Pld
! width="20"|W
! width="20"|D
! width="20"|L
! width="20"|F
! width="20"|A
! width="25"|+/-
! width="20"|BP
! width="20"|Pts
|-
|align=left| Newfoundland Rock
|6||6||0||0||259||49||+210||5||29
|-
|align=left| Toronto Xtreme
|6||5||0||1||225||70||+155||6||26
|-
|align=left| Niagara Thunder
|6||4||0||2||161||85||+76||4||20
|-
|align=left| Ottawa Harlequins
|6||3||0||3||96||190||-94||0||12
|-
|align=left| Quebec Caribou
|6||1||0||5||66||172||-106||1||5
|-
|align=left| Nova Scotia Keltics
|6||1||0||5||100||219||-119||1||5
|-
|align=left| New Brunswick Black Spruce
|6||1||0||5||61||183||-122||0||4
|}

Championship final

The Vancouver Island Crimson Tide (Eastern Division champions) defeated the Newfoundland Rock (Western Division Champions) 14-8 in the Championship Final, played in St. John's, Newfoundland and Labrador on 14 August 2004 to win the MacTier Cup.

References 

Rugby Canada Super League seasons
RCSL Season
RCSL